Below is the list of asteroids that have come close to Earth in 2023.

Timeline of known close approaches less than one lunar distance from Earth 
A list of known near-Earth asteroid close approaches less than 1 lunar distance from Earth in 2023. As most asteroids passing within a lunar distance are less than 40 meters in diameter, they generally are not detected until they are within several million km of Earth. Objects coming from the direction of the Sun may not be publicly announced until a few days after closest approach. For example,  was first imaged six hours after closest approach, then confirmed by other observations, but not officially announced until 3.5 days after closest approach.

Notes

Beyond 1 LD 
Below is an example list of near-Earth asteroids that nominally will pass more than 1 lunar distance (384,400 km or 0.00256 AU) from Earth in 2023. During 2022, over 1,000 asteroids passed within  of Earth.

Notes

See also 
List of asteroid close approaches to Earth
List of asteroid close approaches to Earth in 2022
Asteroid impact prediction

References 

close approaches to Earth in 2023
Near-Earth asteroids